Ernst von Wolzogen (23 April 1855 – 30 August 1934) was a cultural critic, a writer and a founder of Cabaret in Germany.

Biography
Wolzogen came from a noble Austrian family; he studied Literature, Philosophy, and the history of art in Strasbourg and Leipzig.  In 1882, he went to Berlin where he worked as an editor at a publishing house and later became an independent writer.  From 1892 to 1899, he lived in Munich where he founded the Freie Literarische Gesellschaft, a literary society.  In 1899, he returned in Berlin where he established the Cabaret Überbrettl, a play on Nietzsche's term Übermensch. He married Elsa Laura Seemann von Mangern in 1902, and wrote social satires for Überbrettl. After its closure in 1905, he returned to Darmstadt.

Wolzogen produced a great many works of humorous fiction. Some of his works include Die Kinder der Exzellenz (1888); Das Lumpengesindel (1892); Ein unbeschriebenes Blatt (1896); Der Kraft-Mayr, 2 vols.(1897); Das dritte Geschlecht, 2 vols. (1899). Although primarily a humorist, he also wrote on serious topics. Works such as Fahnenflucht (1894), Das Wunderbare (1898), and Die arme Sünderin (1901) are examples of his more serious side as an author. Wolzogen work is known for its wit and elegance.

Works

 1879 Um 13 Uhr in der Christnacht
 1885 Wilkie Collins: Ein Biographisch-Kritischer Versuch, biography
 1886 Heiteres und Weiteres, poetry
 1887 Thüringer Roman
 1888 Die Kinder der Excellenz, novel
 1890 Die tolle Komteß, novel
 1890 Er photographiert, comedy
 1892 Das Lumpengesindel, tragic comedy
 1894 Das gute Krokodil und andere Geschichten
 1897 Der Kraft-Mayr, novel
 1897 Die Gloria-Hose, short story
 1899 Das dritte Geschlecht, novel
 1901 Feuersnot, opera libretto, set to music by Richard Strauss
 1905 Verse aus meinem Leben
 1923 Wie ich mich ums Leben brachte (autobiography; anti-semitic)

References

External links
 
 
 

1855 births
1934 deaths
Writers from Wrocław
Austrian opera librettists
German opera librettists
People from the Province of Silesia
German male dramatists and playwrights
19th-century German dramatists and playwrights
19th-century German male writers
20th-century German dramatists and playwrights